The 2012–13 ACC men's basketball season followed by the start of the 2012–13 NCAA Division I men's basketball season. in November Conference play started in early January 2013 and concluded in March with the 2013 ACC men's basketball tournament at the Greensboro Coliseum in Greensboro

Preseason

() first place votes

Preseason All-ACC teams

Coaches select 8 players
Players in bold are choices for ACC Player of the Year

Rankings

Conference schedules

Composite matrix
This table summarizes the head-to-head results between teams in conference play. (x) indicates games remaining this season.

Boston College

|-
!colspan=12 style="background:#8B0000; color:#F0E68C;"| ACC Regular Season

|-
!colspan=12 style="text-align: center; background:#8B0000"|2013 ACC tournament

Clemson

|-
!colspan=12 style="background:#522D80; color:#F66733;"| ACC Regular Season

|-
!colspan=12 style="text-align: center; background:#522D80"|2013 ACC tournament

Duke

|-
!colspan=12 style="background:#00009C; color:white;"| ACC Regular Season
|-

|-
!colspan=12 style="background:#00009C; color:white;"| 2013 ACC tournament

|-
!colspan=12 style="background:#00009C; color:white;"| 2013 NCAA tournament

|-

Florida State

|-
!colspan=12 style="background:#990000; color:#CCCC66;"| ACC Regular Season

|-
!colspan=12 style="background:#990000; color:#CCCC66;"|2013 ACC tournament

|-
!colspan=12 style="background:#990000; color:#CCCC66;"|2013 NIT

|-
| colspan="12" | *Non-Conference Game. Rankings from AP poll. All times are in Eastern Time. (#) Number seeded with region.
|}

Georgia Tech

|-
!colspan=12 style="background:#CFB53B; color:white;"| ACC Regular Season

|-
!colspan=12 style="text-align: center; background:#CFB53B"|2013 ACC tournament

Maryland

|-
!colspan=12 style="background:#CE1126; color:white;"| ACC Regular Season

|-
!colspan=12 style="background:#CE1126; color:white;"|2013 ACC tournament

|-
!colspan=12 style="background:#CE1126; color:white;"|2013 NIT

|-

Miami

|-
!colspan=12 style="background:#005030; color:#F47321;"| ACC Regular Season

|-
!colspan=12 style="text-align: center; background:#005030"|2013 ACC tournament

|-
!colspan=12 style="text-align: center; background:#005030"|2013 NCAA tournament

|-

North Carolina

|-
!colspan=12 style="background:#56A0D3; color:white;"| ACC Regular Season

|-
!colspan=12 style="background:#56A0D3; color:white;"| 2013 ACC tournament

|-
!colspan=12 style="background:#56A0D3; color:white;"| 2013 NCAA tournament

NC State

|-
!colspan=12 style="background:#E00000; color:white;"| ACC Regular Season

|-
!colspan=12 style="background:#E00000; color:white;"| 2013 ACC tournament

|-
!colspan=12 style="background:#E00000; color:white;"| 2013 NCAA tournament

Virginia

|-
!colspan=12 style="background:#0D3268; color:#FF7C00;"| ACC Regular Season

|-
!colspan=12 style="text-align: center; background:#0D3268"|2013 ACC tournament 

|-
!colspan=12 style="text-align: center; background:#0D3268"|2013 NIT

|-

Virginia Tech

|-
!colspan=12 style="background:#660000; color:#CC5500;"| ACC Regular Season

|-
!colspan=12 style="text-align: center; background:#660000"|2013 ACC tournament

Wake Forest

|-
!colspan=12 style="background:#CFB53B; color:black;"| ACC Regular Season

|-
!colspan=12 style="text-align: center; background:#CFB53B"|2013 ACC tournament

Postseason

ACC tournament

  March 14–17, 2013– Atlantic Coast Conference Basketball Tournament, Greensboro Coliseum, Greensboro, NC.

NCAA tournament

National Invitation tournament

College Basketball Invitational

NBA Draft
Several players from the conference declared early for the NBA draft. The following all-conference selections were listed as seniors: .  Several players were among the 60 players invited to the 2013 NBA Draft Combine.

Honors and awards

Consensus All-Americans
Mason Plumlee, Duke (Second Team)

All-ACC awards and teams
Player of the Year

Erick Green, Virginia Tech (ACC media's selection)
Shane Larkin, Miami (ACC coaches' selection)

Rookie of the Year

Olivier Hanlan, Boston College

Coach of the Year
Jim Larranaga, Miami

Defensive Player of the Year
Durand Scott, Miami

References